Merdeka Square is a square located in Kota Kinabalu, Sabah, Malaysia. The square has a capacity of around 5,000.

History 

The square once became the site for sporting event during British North Borneo Crown period. Before the Jesselton Community Hall was built in the 1950s, the square is not just used as a football field, but also became a parade site especially before the construction of Kota Kinabalu Sports Complex. On 16 September 1963, the late Chief Minister Donald Stephens declared the formation of the Federation of Malaysia at the site. Since then, the square is only used for small ceremonies. In 2015, the square was closed for several months for renovation works. On 23 February 2018, it is one of 24 heritage sites in the state that were gazetted by Sabah’s State Heritage Council under new enactment of "State Heritage Enactment 2017".

See also 
 Merdeka Square, Kuala Lumpur
 Merdeka Square, Jakarta

References

External links 
 

Squares in Malaysia
Tourist attractions in Sabah